Kendriya Vidyalya Tenga Valley is a school in Tenga Valley, West Kameng district in Arunachal Pradesh, India. It was established in 1973 by the Kendriya Vidyalaya Sangathan under the Ministry of Human Resource Development, Government of India. It provides education up to grade 12.

History
Maj. Gen A. N. Mathur was the first chairman of the Vidyalaya, and K. L. Katiar worked as the first principal. The Vidyalaya has had 25 chairmen and 17 principals so far. The foundation stone of the present building was laid by Bansi Lal, Defence Minister, on 17 April 1976. It was inaugurated on 29 March 1977 by Lt. Gen S.L. Menezes.

At present there are 679 students getting education in this Vidyalaya, under the guidance of 37 members of staff.

See also
 List of Kendriya Vidyalayas

References

External links
 Kendriya Vidyalya Tenga Valley, Official website
 Kendriya Vidyalya Tenga Valley at Facebook

West Kameng district
Schools in Arunachal Pradesh
Kendriya Vidyalayas
Educational institutions established in 1973
1973 establishments in Arunachal Pradesh
Government schools in India
Co-educational schools in India